Pascual Sigala Páez (28 January 1968 – 26 May 2020) was a Mexican politician affiliated with the Party of the Democratic Revolution. He served as Deputy of the LIX Legislature of the Mexican Congress representing Michoacán. He was congressman at both the local and federal level, Secretary of Social Development and was Secretary of State of Michoacan until the end of March 2019.

References

1968 births
2020 deaths
Politicians from Durango
Party of the Democratic Revolution politicians
21st-century Mexican politicians
Deputies of the LIX Legislature of Mexico
Members of the Chamber of Deputies (Mexico) for Michoacán